Jorge Villasante Araníbar (born 1962) is a Peruvian politician, who was the Peruvian Minister of Production under President Alan García between September 2010 and May 2011.

References

1962 births
Living people
Government ministers of Peru
Ministers of Agriculture of Peru